Heinrich Proch (22 July 1809 – 18 December 1878) was an Austrian composer.

Born in Vienna, Proch studied jurisprudence and completed his training as a violinist in his native city. From 1834 to 1867, he was a member of the Vienna Hofkapelle. He was also Kapellmeister at the Theater in der Josefstadt between 1837 and 1840, after which he became First Kapellmeister at the Theater am Kärntnertor, the predecessor of the Vienna State Opera. Besides his conducting duties, Proch also worked as a singing teacher.

He composed one opera (Ring und Maske), three operettas, incidental music, orchestral works, and chamber music, as well as over 200 lieder, and won further distinction for his translations of Italian operas (e.g., Verdi's Il trovatore, Donizetti's Don Pasquale). Today, his most famous composition remains the air with variations Deh! torna mio bene, a virtuosic work for coloratura soprano that has been recorded by most sopranos from Luisa Tetrazzini and Amelita Galli-Curci to Maria Callas.

Proch died in Vienna. His daughter, Louise Proch, became a well-known singer and actor.

Further reading
 Inge-Christa Völker, Heinrich Proch. Sein Leben und Wirken (Vienna, 1949)

External links

1809 births
1878 deaths
19th-century classical composers
19th-century conductors (music)
19th-century violinists
Austrian conductors (music)
Austrian male classical composers
Austrian opera composers
Austrian Romantic composers
Austrian violinists
Concert band composers
Male opera composers
Male conductors (music)
Male violinists
Musicians from Vienna
Composers from Vienna